The 1975 World Karate Championships are the 3rd edition of the World Karate Championships, and were held in Long Beach, United States in 1975.

Medalists

Medal table

References

External links
 World Karate Federation

World Championships
World Karate Championships
World Karate Championships
Karate Championships
Karate competitions in the United States